Leary Elementary School may refer to:

F G Leary Elementary School, British Columbia
Leary Elementary School (Warminster, Pennsylvania)